A Hill on the Dark Side of the Moon is a 1983 Swedish drama film about the life of the Russian mathematician Sofia Kovalevskaya, written by Agneta Pleijel and directed by Lennart Hjulström. Gunilla Nyroos won the award for Best Actress at the 20th Guldbagge Awards.

Cast
 Bibi Andersson as Ann-Charlotte Leffler
 Thommy Berggren as Maxim Kovalevskij
 Roland Hedlund as Anton
 Gerd Hegnell as Martha Mittag-Leffler
 Ingvar Hirdwall as Gustaf Edgren
 Gunilla Nyroos as Sonja Kovalevskij
 Lina Pleijel as Foufa Kovaevskij
 Birgitta Ulfsson as Greta
 Iwar Wiklander as Gösta Mittag-Leffler

See also
 Sofia Kovalevskaya (film) — a biographical television miniseries

References

External links
 
 

1983 films
1983 drama films
Biographical films about mathematicians
Swedish drama films
1980s Swedish-language films
1980s Swedish films